Epidirona is a genus of sea snails, marine gastropod mollusks in the family Horaiclavidae.

This genus is considered by WoRMS as a synonym of Epideira Hedley, 1918

Species
Species within the genus Epidirona include:

 Epidirona beachportensis (Cotton & Godfrey, 1938): synonym of Epideira beachportensis Cotton & Godfrey, 1938
 Epidirona candida Laseron, 1954: synonym of Epideira candida (Laseron, 1954)
 Epidirona carinata Laseron, 1954: synonym of Epideira carinata (Laseron, 1954)
 Epidirona costifera Laseron, 1954: synonym of Epideira tuberculata (Laseron, 1954)
 Epidirona flindersi (Cotton & Godfrey, 1938): synonym of Epideira flindersi Cotton & Godfrey, 1938
 Epidirona hedleyi Iredale, 1931: synonym of Epideira hedleyi (Iredale, 1931)
 Epidirona molleri Laseron, 1954: synonym of Epideira carinata (Laseron, 1954)
 Epidirona multiseriata (Smith E. A., 1877): synonym of Epideira multiseriata (E. A. Smith, 1877)
 Epidirona nodulosa Laseron, 1954: synonym of Epideira nodulosa (Laseron, 1954)
 Epidirona perksi (Verco, 1896): synonym of Epideira perksi (Verco, 1896)
 Epidirona philipineri (Tenison-Woods, 1877): synonym of Epideira philipineri (Tenison Woods, 1877)
 Epidirona quoyi (Desmoulins, 1842): synonym of Epideira quoyi (Desmoulins, 1842)
 Epidirona schoutanica (May, 1911): synonym of Epideira schoutanica (May, 1911)
 Epidirona torquata (Hedley, 1922): synonym of Epideira torquata Hedley, 1922
 Epidirona tuberculata Laseron, 1954: synonym of Epideira tuberculata (Laseron, 1954)
 Epidirona xanthophaes (Watson, 1886): synonym of Epidirella xanthophaes (R. B. Watson, 1886)

References

External links

Horaiclavidae